Cheshmeh-ye Gholam Veys (also Romanized as Cheshmeh-ye Gholām Veys) is a village in Kanduleh Rural District, Dinavar District, Sahneh County, Kermanshah Province, Iran. At the 2006 census, its population was 297, in 79 families.

References 

Populated places in Sahneh County